Aalasyam Amrutam  (meaning: The Delay is Sweet/Sweet Delay) is a 2010  Indian Telugu-language comedy film directed by  Chandra Mahesh  and  produced by D. Ramanaidu  for Suresh Productions. Nikhil Siddharth and Madalasa Sharma playing the lead roles.

Plot
Ram (Nikhil) is a young man who has recently got a job in the USA. After visiting the Annavaram Temple, he's waiting for his train to reach the city, from where he can take off to the US. Here he meets Vaidehi (Madalasa Sharma) who has runaway from home, because her parents want to marry her off to someone she doesn't like. Vaidehi has a dark side, which she doesn't want anyone around her to know about.
Together Ram and Vaidehi chance upon a months old baby, who has been left abandoned at the station. Ram, being a kind hearted guy, doesn't want to leave the baby. Luckily for him, his train is late. In the meantime both he and Vaidehi try to find the baby's parents.

Cast
 Nikhil Siddharth as Ram
 Madalasa Sharma as Vaidehi
 Arvind Krishna
 Gundu Sudarshan
 Raghu Babu as Railway Police Officer
 Ali as Thief
 AVS
 Dharmavarapu Subramanyam
 M. S. Narayana as Station master
 L. B. Sriram
 Shiva Reddy
 Tirupathi Prakash

Soundtrack

Release 
Rediff said that "On the whole, Alasyam Amrutham makes for an interesting watch".

References

External links

2010 films
2010s Telugu-language films
Films scored by Koti
Suresh Productions films
2010 romantic comedy films